The 2007 Ontario general election took place on Wednesday, October 10, 2007.  The list of candidates was finalized by Elections Ontario on September 19, 2007.

Candidates by party
Liberal Party candidates, 2007 Ontario provincial election
Progressive Conservative Party candidates, 2007 Ontario provincial election
Ontario New Democratic Party candidates, 2007 Ontario provincial election
Green Party candidates, 2007 Ontario provincial election
Family Coalition Party candidates, 2007 Ontario provincial election
Libertarian Party candidates, 2007 Ontario provincial election
Freedom Party candidates, 2007 Ontario provincial election

Candidates by region

Ottawa

|-
|bgcolor=whitesmoke|Carleton—Mississippi Mills
|
|Megan Cornell  16 776 (31.93%)
||
|Norm Sterling 25 126 (47.83%)
|
|Michael Hadskis  4 002 (7.62%)
|
|John Ogilvie  5 517 (10.50%)
|
|Reynolds James  419 (0.80%)
|
|Rob Alexander (Libert)  693 (1.32%)
||
|Norm Sterling
|-
|bgcolor=whitesmoke|Nepean—Carleton
|
|Jai Aggarwal  17 731 (32.94%)
||
|Lisa MacLeod  27 070 (50.28%)
|
|Tristan Maack  4 000 (7.43%)
|
|Gordon Kubanek  4 500 (8.36%)
|
|Suzanne FortinWikinews interview  533 (0.99%)
|
|
||
|Lisa MacLeod
|-
|bgcolor=whitesmoke|Ottawa Centre
||
|Yasir Naqvi  18 255 (34.91%)
|
|Trina Morissette  10 430 (19.92%)
|
|Will Murray  16 161 (30.90%)
|
|Greg Laxton 6 458 (12.35%)
|
|Danny Moran 516 (0.99%)
|
|Richard Eveleigh (Ind)  283 (0.54%)  Stuart Ryan (Comm.)  204 (0.39%) 
||
|Richard Patten†
|-
|bgcolor=whitesmoke|Ottawa—Orléans
||
|Phil McNeely  25 649 (52.86%)
|
|Graham Fox  16 695 (34.41%)
|
|Andrée Germain  3 088 (6.36%)
|
|Akbar Manoussi  2 214 (4.56%)
|
|Jeremy Atkinson  692 (1.43%)
|
|David McGruer (Freedom)  183 (0.38%)  
||
|Phil McNeely
|-
|bgcolor=whitesmoke|Ottawa South
||
|Dalton McGuinty  24 015 (50.13%)
|
|Richard Raymond  14 206 (29.66%)
|
|Edelweiss D'Andrea  4 467 (9.33%)
|
|John Ford  3 902 (8.15%)
|
|David MacDonald  927 (1.94%)
|
|Jean-Serge Brisson (Libert)  384 (0.80%)
||
|Dalton McGuinty
|-
|bgcolor=whitesmoke|Ottawa—Vanier
||
|Madeleine Meilleur  20 954 (50.96%)
|
|Bruce Poulin  9 169 (22.30%)
|
|Ric Dagenais  6 049 (14.71%)
|
|Leonard Poole  4 293 (10.44%)
|
|Frank Cioppa  396 (0.96%)
|
|Robert Larter (Ind)  207 (0.44%)
||
|Madeleine Meilleur
|-
|bgcolor=whitesmoke|Ottawa West—Nepean
||
|Jim Watson  23 842 (50.64%)
|
|Mike Patton  14 971 (31.80%)
|
|Lynn Hamilton  4 564 (9.69%)
|
|Martin HydeWikinews interview  2 903 (6.17%)
|
|John Pacheco  592 (1.26%)
|
|Robert Gauthier (Ind)  207 (0.44%)
||
|Jim Watson
|-
|}

Eastern Ontario

|-
|bgcolor=whitesmoke|Glengarry—Prescott—Russell
||
|Jean-Marc Lalonde  24 345 (60.51%)
|
|Dennis Pommainville  10 927 (27.16%)
|
|Josée Blanchette  2 281 (5.67%)
|
|Karolyne Pickett  2 344 (5.83%)
|
|Vicki Gunn 337 (0.84%)
|
|
||
|Jean-Marc Lalonde
|-
|bgcolor=whitesmoke|Kingston and the Islands
||
|John Gerretsen  23 277 (47.23%)
|
|John Rapin  11 001 (22.32%)
|
|Rick Downes  10 129 (20.55%)
|
|Bridget Doherty  4 321 (8.77%)
|
|Chris Beneteau 419 (0.85%)
|
|Mark Fournier (Freedom)  137 (0.28%)
||
|John Gerretsen
|-
|bgcolor=whitesmoke|Lanark—Frontenac—Lennox and Addington
|
|Ian Wilson17 393 (38.76%)
||
|Randy Hillier  18 213 (40.58%)
|
|Ross Sutherland  5 623 (12.53%)
|
|Rolly Montpellier  3 186 (7.10%)
|
|Stella Postma  462 (1.03%)
|
|
|
|align="center"|new district
|-
|bgcolor=whitesmoke|Leeds—Grenville
|
|Lori Bryden  11 602 (28.67%)
||
|Bob Runciman  22 755 (56.24%)
|
|Pauline Kuhlman  2 821 (6.97%)
|
|Jeanie Warnock  2 907 (7.19%)
|
|Michael Dwyer  377 (0.93%)
|
| 
||
|Bob Runciman
|-
|rowspan=3 bgcolor=whitesmoke|Prince Edward—Hastings
|rowspan=3 |
|rowspan=3|Leona Dombrowsky  20 963 (46.36%)
|rowspan=3|
|rowspan=3|Eric DenOuden  14 840 (32.82%)
|rowspan=3|
|rowspan=3|Jodie Jenkins  6 287 (13.90%)
|rowspan=3|
|rowspan=3|Jim Arkilander  2 663 (5.89%)
|rowspan=3|
|rowspan=3|Vito Luceno  297 (0.66%)
|rowspan=3|
|rowspan=3|Trueman Tuck (Republican)  166 (0.37%)
||
|Leona Dombrowsky
|-
|colspan=2 align="center"|merged district
|-
||
|Ernie Parsons†
|-
|bgcolor=whitesmoke|Renfrew—Nipissing—Pembroke
|
|Sean Kelly  9 905 (24.72%)
||
|John Yakabuski 24 975 (62.34%)
|
|Felicite StairsWikinews interview  3 038 (7.58%)
|
||Mark Mackenzie  1 777 (4.44%)
|
|Bruce Dean  292 (0.73%)
|
|Tilton Beaumont (Cor)  76 (0.19%)
||
|John Yakabuski
|-
|bgcolor=whitesmoke|Stormont—Dundas—South Glengarry
||
|Jim Brownell  18 660 (48.86%)
|
|Chris Savard  14 794 (38.73%)
|
|Lori Taylor  2 813 (7.37%)
|
|Elaine Kennedy  1 680 (4.40%)
|
|Lukas Bebjack  247 (0.65%)
|
|
||
|Jim Brownell
|-
|}

Central Ontario

|-
|bgcolor=whitesmoke|Barrie
||
|Aileen Carroll  19 548 (42.20%)
|
|Joe Tascona  18 167 (39.22%)
|
|Larry Taylor  3 700 (7.99%)
|
|Erich Jacoby-Hawkins  4 385 (9.47%)
|
|Roberto Sales  173 (0.37%)
|
|Paolo Fabrizio (Libert)  168 (0.36%)  Darren Roskam (Ind)  102 (0.22%)  Daniel Gary Predie (Ind)  77 (0.17%) 
||
|Joe Tascona
|-
|bgcolor=whitesmoke|Bruce—Grey—Owen Sound
|
|Selwyn Hicks  6 774 (14.93%)
||
|Bill Murdoch  21 156 (46.61%)
|
|Paul Johnstone(Wikinews interview)  1 721 (3.79%)
|
|Shane Jolley  15 039 (33.14%)
|
|Irma De Vries  550 (1.21%)
|
|William Cook (Reform)  145 (0.32%)
||
|Bill Murdoch
|-
|bgcolor=whitesmoke|Dufferin—Caledon
|
|Elizabeth Hall  12 638 (32.01%)
||
|Sylvia Jones  16 522 (41.85%) 
|
|Lynda McDougall  3 893 (9.86%)
|
|Rob Strang  6 430 (16.29%)
|
| 
|
|
||
|John Tory†
|-
|bgcolor=whitesmoke|Durham
|
|Betty Somerville  14 730 (32.15%)
||
|John O'Toole  21 515 (46.96%)
|
|Catherine Robinson  5 521 (12.05%)
|
|June Davis  4 053 (8.85%)
|
|
|
|
||
|John O'Toole
|-
|bgcolor=whitesmoke|Haliburton—Kawartha Lakes—Brock
|
|Rick Johnson  14 327 (29.51%)
||
|Laurie Scott 24 273 (49.99%)
|
|Joan Corigan  5 785 (11.92%)
|
|Doug Smith  3 475 (7.16%)
|
|Jake Pothaar  301 (0.62%)
|
|Bill Denby (Freedom)  391 (0.81%)
||
|Laurie Scott
|-
|bgcolor=whitesmoke|Newmarket—Aurora
|
|Christina Bisanz  18 105 (39.74%)
||
|Frank Klees 19 460 (42.72%)
|
|Mike Seaward  3 290 (7.22%)
|
|John McRogers  4 182 (9.18%)
|
|Tad Brudzinski  249 (0.55%)
|
|Craig Hodgins (Libert)  269 (0.59%)
||
|Frank Klees 
|-
|bgcolor=whitesmoke|Northumberland—Quinte West
||
|Lou Rinaldi  22 287 (45.37%)
|
|Cathy Galt  15 330 (31.21%)
|
|Carol Blaind  6 492 (13.22%)
|
|Judy Smith Torrie  5 012 (10.20%)
|
| 
|
|
||
|Lou Rinaldi
|-
|bgcolor=whitesmoke|Peterborough
||
|Jeff Leal  24 466 (47.72%)
|
|Bruce Fitzpatrick  13 176 (25.70%)
|
|Dave Nickle  8 523 (16.62%)
|
|Miriam Stucky  4 473 (8.72%)
|
|Paul Morgan  634 (1.24%)
|
|
||
|Jeff Leal
|-
|bgcolor=whitesmoke|Simcoe—Grey
|
|Steven H. Fishman  12 447 (25.97%)
||
|Jim Wilson  24 270 (50.65%)
|
|Katy Austin  4 417 (9.22%)
|
|Peter Ellis  5 428 (11.33%)
|
|Steven Taylor  361 (0.75%)
|
| Phil Bender (Libert)  724 (1.51%) Owen Alastair Ferguson(Ind)  273 (0.57%)
||
|Jim Wilson
|-
|bgcolor=whitesmoke|Simcoe North
|
|Laura Domsy  14 094 (30.55%)
||
|Garfield Dunlop  22 986 (49.82%)
|
|Andrew Hill  4 240 (9.19%)
|
|Wayne Varcoe  4 709 (10.21%)
|
| 
|
|Dane Raybauld (Libert)  112 (0.24%)
||
|Garfield Dunlop
|-
|bgcolor=whitesmoke|York—Simcoe
|
|John Gilbank  12 785 (30.83%)
||
|Julia Munro  19 173 (46.23%)
|
|Nancy Morrison  4 205 (10.14%)
|
|Jim Reeves  4 664 (11.25%)
|
|Victor Carvalho  297 (0.72%)
|
|Caley McKibbin (Libert)  348 (0.84%)
||
|Julia Munro
|}

Southern Durham and York

|-
|bgcolor=whitesmoke|Ajax—Pickering
||
|Joe Dickson  19 857 (49.07%)
|
|Kevin Ashe  13 898 (34.35%)
|
|Bala Thavarajasoorier  3 275 (8.09%)
|
|Cecile Willert  3 067 (7.58%)
|
|Andrew Carvalho  368 (0.91%)
|
|
|
|align=center|new district
|-
|bgcolor=whitesmoke|Markham—Unionville
||
|Michael Chan  21 149 (59.47%)
|
|Ki Kit Li  9 574 (26.92%)
|
|Andy Arifin  2 597 (7.30%)
|
|Bernadette Manning  1 910 (5.37%)
|
|Leon Williams  335 (0.94%)
|
|
||
|Michael Chan
|-
|bgcolor=whitesmoke|Oak Ridges—Markham
||
|Helena Jaczek  28 564 (48.22%)
|
|Phil Bannon  21 367 (36.07%)
|
|Janice Hagan  4 698 (7.93%)
|
|Attila Nagy  3 815 (6.44%)
|
|Pat Redmond  455 (0.77%)
|
|Doug Ransom (Ind)  342 (0.58%)
|
|align=center|new district
|-
|bgcolor=whitesmoke|Oshawa
|
|Faelyne Templer  8 764 (21.40%)
||
|Jerry Ouellette  15 977 (39.02%)
|
|Sid Ryan  13 482 (32.92%)
|
|Alexander Kemp  2 474 (6.04%)
|
|Jeffrey Streutker  253 (0.62%)
|
| 
||
|Jerry Ouellette
|-
|bgcolor=whitesmoke|Pickering—Scarborough East
||
|Wayne Arthurs  19 762 (48.63%)
|
|Diana Hall  12 884 (31.70%)
|
|Andrea Moffat  4 563 (11.23%)
|
|Anita Lachlan  2 572 (6.33%)
|
|Mitchell Persaud  210 (0.52%)
|
|Josh Insang (Libert)  375 (0.92%)  John Newell (Ind)  275 (0.68%) 
||
|Wayne Arthurs
|-
|bgcolor=whitesmoke|Richmond Hill
||
|Reza Moridi  19 456 (47.83%)
|
|Alex Yuan  14 127 (34.73%)
|
|Nella Cotrupi  3 565 (8.76%)
|
|Liz Couture  3 210 (7.89%)
|
|Lisa Kidd  318 (0.78%)
|
|
|
|align=center|new district
|-
|bgcolor=whitesmoke|Thornhill
|
|Mario Racco  20 497 (42.31%)
||
|Peter Shurman  22 025 (45.47%)
|
|Sandra Parrott  2 867 (5.92%)
|
|Lloyd Helferty  2 507 (5.18%)
|
|Nathan Kidd  216 (0.45%)
|
|Malcolm Kojokaro (Ind)  187 (0.39%) Lindsay King (Freedom)  142 (0.29%)
||
|Mario Racco
|-
|bgcolor=whitesmoke|Vaughan
||
|Greg Sorbara  28 964 (61.90%)
|
|Gayani Weerasinghe  8 759 (18.72%)
|
|Rick Morelli  5 470 (11.69%)
|
|Russell Korus  2 975 (6.36%)
|
|
|
|Savino Quatela (Ind)  623 (1.33%)
||
|Greg Sorbara
|-
|bgcolor=whitesmoke|Whitby—Oshawa
|
|Laura Hammer  18 560 (35.99%)
||
|Christine Elliott  22 694 (44.0%)
|
|Nigel Moses  5 733 (11.12%)
|
|Doug AndersonWikinews interview  3 745 (7.26%)
|
|Dale Chilvers  275 (0.53%)
|
|Marty Gobin (Libert)  414 (0.80%)  Bill Frampton (Freedom)  150 (0.29%)
||
|Christine Elliott
|}

Toronto

Toronto East Region

|-
|bgcolor=whitesmoke|Scarborough—Agincourt
||
|Gerry Phillips  19 541 (58.08%)
|
|John Del Grande  8 531 (25.36%)
|
|Yvette Blackburn  3 531 (7.31%)
|
|George Pappas  1 511 (4.49%)
|
|Max Wang  532 (1.58%)
|
|
||
|Gerry Phillips
|-
|bgcolor=whitesmoke|Scarborough Centre
||
|Brad Duguid  17 775 (53.66%)
|
|Samy Appadurai  8 320 (25.12%)
|
|Kathleen Mathurin  4 401 (13.29%)
|
|Andrew Strachan  1 827 (5.52%)
|
|Tom Lang  451 (1.36%)
|
|David Predovich (Libert)  349 (1.05%)
||
|Brad Duguid
|-
|bgcolor=whitesmoke|Scarborough—Guildwood
||
|Margarett Best  14 430 (42.52%)
|
|Gary Grant  9 502 (28.00%)
|
|Neethan Shan  7 441 (21.92%)
|
|Glenn Kitchen  1 811 (5.34%)
|
|Daniel Carvalho  267 (0.79%)
|
|Sam Apelbaum (Libert)  484 (1.43%)
||
|Mary Anne Chambers†
|-
|bgcolor=whitesmoke|Scarborough—Rouge River
||
|Bas Balkissoon  22 307 (65.06%)
|
|Horace Gooden  4 960 (14.47%)
|
|Sheila White(Wikinews interview)  4 691 (13.68%)
|
|Serge Abbat  1 276 (3.72%)
|
|Joseph Carvalho  569 (1.66%)
|
|Alan Mercer (Libert)  486 (1.42%)
||
|Bas Balkissoon
|-
|bgcolor=whitesmoke|Scarborough Southwest
||
|Lorenzo Berardinetti  15 114 (46.15%)
|
|Gary Crawford  8 359 (25.53%)
|
|Jay Sarkar  5 930 (18.11%)
|
|Stefan Dixon  2 649 (8.09%)
|
|Victor Borkowski  399 (1.22%)
|
|George Dance (Libert)  296 (0.90%)
||
|Lorenzo Berardinetti
|}

Toronto North Region

|-
|bgcolor=whitesmoke|Don Valley East
||
|David Caplan  19 667 (55.63%)
|
|Angela Kennedy  8 878 (25.11%)
|
|Mary Trapani Hynes  3 759 (10.63%)
|
|Trifon Haitas  2 287 (6.47%)
|
|Ryan Kidd  198 (0.56%)
|
|Stella Kargiannakis (Ind)  467 (1.32%)  Wayne Simmons (Freedom)  99 (0.28%)
||
|David Caplan
|-
|bgcolor=whitesmoke|Don Valley West
||
|Kathleen Wynne  23 080  (50.44%)
|
|John Tory  18 156 (39.68%)
|
|Mike Kenny  2 138 (4.67%)
|
|Adrian Walker  2 202 (4.81%)
|
|Daniel Kidd  183 (0.40%)
|
|
||
|Kathleen Wynne
|-
|bgcolor=whitesmoke|Eglinton—Lawrence
||
|Mike Colle  17 402 (43.23%)
|
|Bernie Tanz  15 257 (37.90%)
|
|Karin Wiens  4 039 (10.03%)
|
|Andrew James  2 871 (7.13%)
| 
|Rina Morra  229 (0.57%)
|
|Tom Gelmon (Libert)  235 (0.58%) Franz Cauchi (Freedom)  130 (0.32%) Joseph Young (Ind [Comm League])  90 (0.22%)
||
|Mike Colle
|-
|bgcolor=whitesmoke|Willowdale
||
|David Zimmer  21 066 (47.73%)
|
|David Shiner  15 588 (35.08%)
|
|Rini Ghosh  3 699 (8.34%)
|
|Torbjorn Zetterlund  2 960 (6.67%)
|
|Kristin Monster  370 (0.83%)
|
|Heath Thomas (Libert)  477 (1.08%)  Charles R. Sutherland (Ind)  119 (0.27%)
||
|David Zimmer
|-
|bgcolor=whitesmoke|York Centre
||
|Monte Kwinter  16 646 (48.73%)
|
|Igor Toutchinski  11 028 (32.28%)
|
|Claudia Rodriguez  3 713 (10.87%)
|
|Marija MinicWikinews interview  2 207 (6.46%)
|
|Marilyn Carvalho  568 (1.66%)
|
|
||
|Monte Kwinter
|-
|}

Toronto South Region 

|-
|bgcolor=whitesmoke|Beaches—East York
|
|Tom Teahen  10 215 (25.84%)
|
|Don Duvall  6 186 (15.59%)
||
|Michael Prue  17 522 (44.32%)
|
|Caroline Law  4 785 (12.10%)
|
|Joel Kidd  201 (0.51%)
|
|Doug Patfield (Libert)  515 (1.30%)  James Whittaker (Freedom)  135 (0.34%)
||
|Michael Prue
|-
|bgcolor=whitesmoke|Davenport
||
|Tony Ruprecht  12 467 (41.82%)
|
|Antonio Garcia  2 805 (9.41%)
|
|Peter Ferreira  10 880 (36.49%)
|
|Frank De Jong  3 047 (10.22%)
|
|Gustavo Valdez  157 (0.53%)
|
|David McKee (Comm.)  191 (0.64%)  Nunzio Venuto (Libert);  152 (0.51%)  Anette Kouri (Ind [Comm League])  114 (0.38%)
||
|Tony Ruprecht
|-
|bgcolor=whitesmoke|St. Paul's
||
|Michael Bryant  21 280 (47.43%)
|
|Lillyann Goldstein  11 910 (26.54%)
|
|Julian Heller  7 061 (15.74%)
|
|Steve D'sa  3 744 (8.34%)
|
|Blaise ThompsonWikinews interview  199 (0.42%)
|
|Charles De Kerckhove (Ind)  328 (0.73%)  John Kittredge (Libert)  240 (0.53%)  Carol Leborg (Freedom)  115 (0.26%)
||
|Michael Bryant
|-
|bgcolor=whitesmoke|Toronto Centre
||
|George Smitherman  21 522 (47.85%)
|
|Pamela Taylor  9 084 (20.20%)
|
|Sandra Gonzalez  8 464 (18.82%)
|
|Mike McLean  4 412 (9.81%)
|
|
|
|Michael Green (Libert)  686 (1.53%)  Danish Ahmed (PFPWSN)  259 (0.58%) Johan Boyden (Comm.)(Wikinews interview); 196 (0.44%)  Philip Fernandez (Ind [M-L])  191 (0.42%)  Gary Leroux (Ind)  167 (0.37%) 
||
|George Smitherman
|-
|bgcolor=whitesmoke|Toronto—Danforth
|
|Joyce Rowlands  11 448 (29.20%)
|
|Robert Bisbicis  4 423 (11.28%)
||
|Peter Tabuns  17 975 (45.85%)
|
|Patrick Kraemer  4 372 (11.15%)
|
|Micheal Kidd  273 (0.70%)
|
|Mark Scott (Libert);Wikinews interview 460 (1.17%)  Shona Bracken (Comm.)Wikinews interview  253 (0.65%)
||
|Peter Tabuns
|-
|bgcolor=whitesmoke|Trinity—Spadina
|
|Kathryn Holloway  14 180 (31.53%)
|
|Tyler Currie  6 235 (13.86%)
||
|Rosario Marchese  18 508 (41.15%)
|
|Dan King  5 156 (11.46%)
|
|
|
|George Sawision (Ind)  350 (0.78%)  John Rubino (PFPWSN)  243 (0.54%)  Charlene Cottle (Ind)  154 (0.34%)  Silvio Ursomarzo (Freedom)  147 (0.33%)
||
|Rosario Marchese
|}

Toronto West Region 

|-
|bgcolor=whitesmoke|Etobicoke Centre
||
|Donna Cansfield  22 939 (50.07%)
|
|Andrew Pringle  15 667 (34.20%)
|
|Anita Agrawal  3 847 (8.40%)
|
|Greg King  3 357 (7.33%)
|
| 
|
|
||
|Donna Cansfield
|-
|bgcolor=whitesmoke|Etobicoke—Lakeshore
||
|Laurel Broten  20 218 (45.99%)
|
|Tom Barlow  13 482 (30.67%)
|
|Andrea Németh  5 837 (13.28%)
|
|Jerry Schulman  3 467 (7.89%)
|
|Bob Williams  480 (1.09%)
|
|Janice Murray (Ind [M-L])  478 (1.09%)
||
|Laurel Broten
|-
|bgcolor=whitesmoke|Etobicoke North
||
|Shafiq Qaadri  15 147 (54.85%)
|
|Mohamed Kassim  5 801 (21.01%)
|
|Mohamed Boudjenane  4 101 (14.85%)
|
|Jama Korshel  1 312 (4.75%)
|
|Theresa Ceolin  1 255 (4.54%)
|
|
||
|Shafiq Qaadri
|-
|bgcolor=whitesmoke|Parkdale—High Park
|
|Sylvia Watson  11 900 (29.24%)
|
|David Hutcheon  6 024 (14.80%)
||
|Cheri DiNovo  18 194 (44.71%)|
|Bruce Hearns  3 938 (9.68%)
|
|Marilee Kidd  312 (0.77%)
|
|Zork Hun (Libert)  326 (0.80%)
||
|Cheri DiNovo
|-
|bgcolor=whitesmoke|York South—Weston
||
|Laura Albanese  13 846 (42.94%)|
|Karen McMillan  3 173 (9.84%)
|
|Paul Ferreira  13 394 (41.54%)
|
|Anthony Gratl  1 226 (3.80%)
|
|Mariangela Sanabria  218 (0.68%)
|
|Marco Dias (Libert)  385 (1.19%)
||
|Paul Ferreira
|-
|bgcolor=whitesmoke|York West
||
|Mario Sergio  13 246 (54.74%)|
|Shane O'Toole  2 484 (10.26%)
|
|Antoni Shelton  6 764 (27.95%)
|
|Sergio Pagnotta  1 199 (4.95%)
|
|Julia Carvalho  282 (1.17%) 
|
|Ram Narula (Ind.)  225 (0.93%)
||
|Mario Sergio
|-
|}

Brampton, Mississauga and Oakville

|-
|bgcolor=whitesmoke|
Bramalea—Gore—Malton
||
|Kuldip Kular  19 106 (47.00%)|
|Pam Hundal  11 934 (29.36%)
|
|Glenn Crowe  5 016 (12.34%)
|
|Bruce HainesWikinews interview  4 120 (10.14%)
|
|Gary Nail  471 (1.16%)
|
|
||
|Kuldip Kular
|-
|bgcolor=whitesmoke|Brampton—Springdale
||
|Linda Jeffrey  17 673 (50.66%)
|
|John Carman McClelland  10 708 (30.70%)
|
|Mani Singh  3 800 (10.89%)
|
|Daniel Cullen  2 292 (6.57%)
|
|Sandy Toteda  258 (0.74%)
|
|Elizabeth Rowley (Comm.)  152 (0.44%)
||
|Linda Jeffrey
|-
|bgcolor=whitesmoke|Brampton West
||
|Vic Dhillon  20 746 (46.19%)
|
|Mark Beckles  15 120 (33.67%)
|
|Garth Bobb  4 901 (10.91%)
|
|Sanjeev Goel  3 471 (7.73%)
|
|Norah Madden  488 (1.09%)
|
|Gurdial Singh Fiji (Ind)  185 (0.41%)
||
|Vic Dhillon
|-
|bgcolor=whitesmoke|Mississauga—Brampton South
||
|Amrit Mangat  19 738 (53.78%)
|
|Ravi Singh  9 333 (25.43%)
|
|Karan Pandher  3 785 (10.31%)
|
|Paul Simas  3 846 (10.48%)
|
| 
|
|
|
|align=center|new district
|-
|bgcolor=whitesmoke|Mississauga East—Cooksville
||
|Peter Fonseca  22 249 (58.93%)
|
|Zoran Churchin  8 715 (23.08%)
|
|Sathish Balasunderam  3 192 (8.46%)
|
|Carla Casanova  2 361 (6.25%)
|
|Al Zawadski  992 (2.63%)
|
|Ryan Jamieson (Freedom)  243 (0.64%)
||
|Peter Fonseca
|-
|bgcolor=whitesmoke|Mississauga—Erindale
||
|Harinder Takhar  21 551 (47.85%)
|
|David Brown  14 913 (33.11%)
|
|Shaila Kibria  5 056 (11.23%)
|
|Richard Pietro  3 521 (7.82%)
|
|
|
|
||
|Harinder Takhar
|-
|bgcolor=whitesmoke|Mississauga South
||
|Charles Sousa  19 195 (46.68%)
|
|Tim Peterson  14 187 (34.50%)
|
|Ken Cole  3 745 (9.11%)
|
|David Johnston  3 629 (8.83%)
|
|Samantha Toteda  365 (0.89%)
|
|
||
|Tim Peterson
|-
|bgcolor=whitesmoke|Mississauga—Streetsville
||
|Bob Delaney  20 264 (52.55%)
|
|Nina Tangri  11 155 (28.93%)
|
|Gail McCabe  3 944 (10.23%)
|
|Scott Warner  2 925 (7.59%)
|
|Masood Atchekzai  274 (0.71%)
|
|
||
|Bob Delaney
|-
|bgcolor=whitesmoke|Oakville
||
|Kevin Flynn  23 761 (49.81%)
|
|Rick Byers 16 659 (34.92%)
|
|Tony Crawford 3 091 (6.48%)
|
|Marion SchafferWikinews interview  3 916 (8.21%)
|
|Micheal Toteda  279 (0.58%)
|
|
||
|Kevin Flynn
|}

Hamilton, Burlington and Niagara

|-
|bgcolor=whitesmoke|Ancaster—Dundas—Flamborough—Westdale
||
|Ted McMeekin  20 445 (41.16%)
|
|Chris Corrigan  17 092 (34.41%)
|
|Juanita Maldonado  6 814 (13.72%)
|
|David Januczkowski  4 112 (8.28%)
|
|Jim Enos  548 (1.10%)
|
|Eileen Butson (Cor)  370 (0.74%) Martin Samuel Zuliniak (Ind)  222 (0.45%)
 Sam Zaslavsky (Libert)  67 (0.13%) 
||
|Ted McMeekin
|-
|bgcolor=whitesmoke|Burlington
|
|Marianne Meed Ward  19 734 (37.79%)
||
|Joyce Savoline  21 578 (41.34%)
|
|Cory Judson  5 728 (10.97%)
|
|Tim Wilson  4 779 (9.16%)
|
|Mark Gamez  391 (0.75%)
|
|
||
|Joyce Savoline
|-
|bgcolor=whitesmoke|Halton
|
|Gary Zemlak  22 501 (41.51%)
||
|Ted Chudleigh  22 667 (41.84%)
|
|Patricia Heroux  4 160 (7.68%)
|
|Andrew Chlobowski  4 376 (8.07%) 
|
|Stan Lazarski  487 (0.90%)
|
|
||
|Ted Chudleigh
|-
|rowspan=3 bgcolor=whitesmoke|Hamilton Centre
|rowspan=3|
|rowspan=3|Steve Ruddick  11 096 (28.89%)
|rowspan=3|
|rowspan=3|Chris Robertson  5 673 (14.77%)
|rowspan=3 |
|rowspan=3|Andrea Horwath  17 176 (44.72%)
|rowspan=3|
|rowspan=3|Peter OrmondWikinews interview  3 610 (9.40%)
|rowspan=3|
|rowspan=3|Lynne Scime  550 (1.43%)
|rowspan=3|
|rowspan=3|Bob Mann (Comm.)  302 (0.79%)
||
|Andrea Horwath
|-
|colspan=2 align=center|merged district
|-
||
|Judy Marsales†
|-
|bgcolor=whitesmoke|Hamilton East—Stoney Creek
|
|Nerene Virgin  15 062 (34.85%)
|
|Tara Crugnale  9 310 (21.54%)
||
|Paul Miller 16 272 (37.65%)
|
|Ray Dartsch  2 122 (4.91%)
|
|Bob Innes  452 (1.05%)
|
|
||
|Jennifer Mossop†
|-
|bgcolor=whitesmoke|Hamilton Mountain
||
|Sophia Aggelonitis  17 387 (37.24%)
|
|Bob Charters  10 982 (23.52%)
|
|Bryan Adamczyk  15 653 (33.53%)
|
|Ivan Miletic  2 172 (4.65%)
|
|Mary Maan  493 (1.06%)
|
|
||
|Marie Bountrogianni† 
|-
|bgcolor=whitesmoke|Niagara Falls
||
|Kim Craitor  22 210 (47.53%)
|
|Bart Maves  14 540 (31.12%)
|
|Mike Piché  4 605 (9.85%)
|
|Melanie Mullen  5 373 (11.50%)
|
| 
|
|
||
|Kim Craitor
|-
|bgcolor=whitesmoke|Niagara West—Glanbrook
|
|Mike Lostracco  14 290 (30.01%)
||
|Tim Hudak  24 311 (51.06%)
|
|Bonnie Bryan  5 809 (12.20%)
|
|Sid Frere  3 206 (6.73%)
|
| 
|
|
||
|Tim Hudak
|-
|bgcolor=whitesmoke|St. Catharines
||
|Jim Bradley  21 029 (47.23%)
|
|Bruce Timms  12 864 (28.89%)
|
|Henry Bosch  7 069 (15.88%)
|
|Byrne Smith  3 152 ((7.08%)
|
|Barra Gots  267 (0.60%)
|
|Sam Hammond (Comm.)  139 (0.31%)
||
|Jim Bradley
|-
|bgcolor=whitesmoke|Welland
|
|John Mastroianni  10 580 (22.91%)
|
|Ron Bodner  8 722 (18.88%)
||
|Peter Kormos  24 910 (53.94%)
|
|Mark Grenier(Wikinews interview)  1 973 (4.27%)
|
| 
|
|
||
|Peter Kormos
|}

Midwestern Ontario

|-
|bgcolor=whitesmoke|Brant
||
|Dave Levac  23 485 (49.16%)
|
|Dan McCreary  13 787 (28.86%)
|
|Brian Van Tilborg  6 536 (13.68%)
|
|Ted Shelegy  3 272 (6.85%)
|
|Rob Ferguson  403 (0.84%)
|
|John Turmel (Ind)  289 (0.60%)
||
|Dave Levac
|-
|bgcolor=whitesmoke|Cambridge
|
|Kathryn McGarry  14 704 (34.17%)
||
|Gerry Martiniuk  17 942 (41.70%)
|
|Mitchell Healey  5 896 (13.70%)
|
|Colin Carmichael  3 842 (8.93%)
|
|Paul Vandervet  646 (1.50%)
|
|
||
|Gerry Martiniuk
|-
|bgcolor=whitesmoke|Guelph
||
|Liz Sandals  20 346 (40.92%)
|
|Bob Senechal  12 180 (24.49%)
|
|Karan Mann-Bowers  6 880 (13.84%)
|
|Ben Polley  9 750 (19.61%)
|
|John Gots  405 (0.81%)
|
|Drew Garvie (Comm.)  166 (0.33%)
||
|Liz Sandals
|-
|bgcolor=whitesmoke|Haldimand—Norfolk
|
|Lorraine Bergstrand  9 536 (22.23%)
||
|Toby Barrett  26 135 (60.92%)
|
|Jan Watson  4 546 (10.60%)
|
|Chad Squizzado  2 230 (5.20%)
|
|Steve Elgersma  457 (1.07%)
|
|
||
|Toby Barrett
|-
|bgcolor=whitesmoke|Huron—Bruce
||
|Carol Mitchell 20 469 (45.95%)
|
|Rob Morley  13 606 (30.54%)
|
|Paul Klopp  5 932 (13.32%)
|
|Victoria Serda  2 911 (6.53%)
|
|Dave Joslin  1 035 (2.32%)
|
|Dennis Valenta (Ind)  393 (0.88%)  Ronald John Stephens (Ind)  202 (0.45%)
||
|Carol Mitchell 
|-
|bgcolor=whitesmoke|Kitchener Centre
||
|John Milloy  17 484 (45.90%)
|
|Matt Stanson  9 717 (25.51%)
|
|Rick Moffitt  6 707 (17.61%)
|
|Daniel Logan  3 162 (8.30%)
|
|Bill Bernhardt   599 (1.57%)
|
|J.D. McGuire (Ind)  425 (1.12%)
||
|John Milloy
|-
|bgcolor=whitesmoke|Kitchener—Conestoga
||
|Leeanna Pendergast  16 315 (41.82%)
|
|Michael Harris  14 450 (37.04%)
|
|Mark Cairns  4 545 (11.65%)
|
|Colin Jones  2 805 (7.19%)
|
|Len Solomon  510 (1.31%)
|
|Larry Stevens (Libert)  246 (0.63%)  David Driver (Freedom)  145 (0.37%)
|
|align=center|new district
|-
|bgcolor=whitesmoke|Kitchener—Waterloo
|
|Louise Ervin  15 848 (31.20%)
||
|Elizabeth Witmer  20 748 (40.84%)
|
|Catherine Fife  8 902 (17.52%)
|
|Judy Greenwood-Speers  4 707 (9.27%)
|
|Lou Reitzel   598 (1.18%)
|
|
||
|Elizabeth Witmer
|-
|bgcolor=whitesmoke|Oxford
|
|Brian Jackson  11 455 (29.36%)
||
|Ernie Hardeman  18 445 (47.27%)
|
|Michael Comeau  4 421 (11.33%)
|
|Tom Mayberry  3 441 (8.82%)
|
|Leonard VanderHoeven  601 (1.54%)
|
|Jim Bender (Ind)  659 (1.69%)
||
|Ernie Hardeman
|-
|bgcolor=whitesmoke|Perth—Wellington
||
|John Wilkinson  18 096 (46.65%)
|
|John Rutherford  12 338 (31.81%)
|
|Donna Hansen  3 912 (10.09%)
|
|Anita Payne  3 051 (7.87%)
|
|Pat Bannon  776 (2.00%)
|
|Rob Smink (Freedom)  399 (1.03%)  Kevin Allman (Ind)  217 (0.56%)
||
|John Wilkinson
|-
|bgcolor=whitesmoke|Wellington—Halton Hills
|
|Marg Bentley  13 312 (30.39%)
||
|Ted Arnott  21 533 (49.16%)
|
|Noel Duignan  3 914 (8.94%)
|
|Martin Lavictoire  4 489 (10.25%)
|
|Giuseppe Gori  555 (1.27%)
|
|
||
|Ted Arnott
|}

Southwestern Ontario

|-
|bgcolor=whitesmoke|Chatham-Kent—Essex
||
|Pat Hoy  18 782 (51.98%)
|
|Doug Jackson  10 367 (28.69%)
|
|Murray Gaudreau  4 601 (12.73%)
|
|Ken Bell  2 054 (5.69%)
|
|Mark Morin(Wikinews interview)  326 (0.90%)
|
|
||
|Pat Hoy
|-
|bgcolor=whitesmoke|Elgin—Middlesex—London
||
|Steve Peters  20 085 (49.10%)
|
|Bill Fehr  12 460 (30.5%)
|
|Brad James  4 643 (11.46%)
|
|Devin Kelly  3 363 (8.22%)
|
| 
|
|Ray Monteith (Freedom)  353 (0.86%)
||
|Steve Peters
|-
|bgcolor=whitesmoke|Essex
||
|Bruce Crozier  19 970 (48.02%)
|
|Richard Kniaziew  10 400 (25.01)%)
|
|John Grima  8 638 (20.77%)
|
|Jessica Fracassi  2 220 (5.34%)
|
|
|
|Aaron Parent (Libert)  358 (0.86%)
||
|Bruce Crozier
|-
|bgcolor=whitesmoke|Lambton—Kent—Middlesex
||
|Maria Van Bommel  18 228 (43.2%)
|
|Monte McNaughton  15 295 (36.27%)
|
|Joyce Joliffe  4 520 (10.73%)
|
|James Armstrong  3 329 (7.90%)
|
|Bill McMaster(Wikinews interview)  549 (1.30%)
|
|Brad Harness (Reform)  209 (0.50%)
||
|Maria Van Bommel
|-
|bgcolor=whitesmoke|London North Centre
||
|Deb Matthews  21 669 (47.17%)
|
|Rob Alder  10 897 (23.72%)
|
|Stephen Holmes  7 649 (16.65%)
|
|Brett McKenzie  5 720 (12.45%)
|
| 
|
|
||
|Deb Matthews
|-
|bgcolor=whitesmoke|London—Fanshawe
||
|Khalil Ramal  13 742 (38.68%)
|
|Jim Chapman(Wikinews interview)  9 760 (27.5%)
|
|Stephen Maynard  9 350 (26.32%)
|
|Daniel O'Neail  2 548 (7.17%)
|
|
|
|Ma'in Sinan (Ind)  129 (0.36%)
||
|Khalil Ramal
|-
|bgcolor=whitesmoke|London West
||
|Chris Bentley  25 967 (52.42%)
|
|Allison Graham  12 011 (24.25%)
|
|Paul Pighin  5 562 (11.23%)
|
|Gary Brown  5 184 (10.47%)
|
|Andrew Jezierski  267 (0.54%)
|
|Paul McKeever (Freedom)  234 (0.47%)  Mike Reynolds (Ind)  201 (0.41%)  Chris Gupta (Republican)  106 (0.21%)
||
|Chris Bentley
|-
|bgcolor=whitesmoke|Sarnia—Lambton
|
|Caroline Di Cocco  12 443 (29.41%)
||
|Bob Bailey  16 145 (38.16%)
|
|Barb Millitt  11 349 (26.82%)
|
|Tim von Bodegom  2 376 (5.62%)
|
| 
|
|
||
|Caroline Di Cocco
|-
|bgcolor=whitesmoke|Windsor—Tecumseh
||
|Dwight Duncan  17 894 (50.19%) 
|
|Kristine Robinson  6 106 (16.84%)
|
|Helmi Charif  8 836 (24.36%)
|
|Andrew McAvoy(Wikinews interview)  2 696 (7.43%)
|
|John Curtin  735 (2.03%)
|
|
||
|Dwight Duncan
|-
|bgcolor=whitesmoke|Windsor West
||
|Sandra Pupatello  16 821 (50.19%)
|
|Lisa Lumley  5 652 (16.86%)
|
|Mariano Klimowicz  8 604 (25.67%)
|
|Jason Haney  1 974 (5.89%)
|
|Daniel Dionne  463 (1.38%)
|
|
||
|Sandra Pupatello
|}

Northern Ontario

|-
|bgcolor=whitesmoke|Algoma—Manitoulin
||
|Mike Brown  11 361 (42.56%)
|
|Ronald Swain  3 744 (14.02%) 
|
|Peter Denley  9 863 (36.95%)
|
|Ron Yurick  1 374 (5.15%)
|
|Ray Scott  354 (1.33%)
|
|
||
|Mike Brown
|-
|bgcolor=whitesmoke|Kenora—Rainy River
|
|Mike Wood  5 752 (24.42%)
|
|Penny Lucas(Wikinews interview)  2 757 (11.70%)
||
|Howard Hampton  14 281 (60.62%)
|
|Jo Jo Holiday  769 (3.26%)
|
|
|
| 
||
|Howard Hampton
|-
|bgcolor=whitesmoke|Nickel Belt
|
|Ron Dupuis  12 364 (38.08%)
|
|Renée Germain  3 263 (10.05%)
||
|France Gélinas  15 126 (46.59%)
|
|Fred Twilley  1 374 (4.23%)
|
|Richard St. Denis  341 (1.05%)
|
|
||
|Shelley Martel†
|-
|bgcolor=whitesmoke|Nipissing
||
|Monique Smith  13 781 (42.11%)
|
|Bill Vrebosch  13 323 (40.71%) 
|
|Henri Giroux  4 136 (12.64%)
|
|Amy Brownridge  1 248 (3.81%)
|
|Suzanne Plouffe  238 (0.73%)
|
|
||
|Monique Smith
|-
|bgcolor=whitesmoke|Parry Sound—Muskoka
|
|Brenda Rhodes  9 819 (26.73%)
||
|Norm Miller  17 348 (47.22%)
|
|Sara Hall  5 015 (13.65%)
|
|Matt Richter  4 557 (12.40%)
|
| 
|
|
||
|Norm Miller
|-
|bgcolor=whitesmoke|Sault Ste. Marie
||
|David Orazietti  19 316 (60.13%)
|
|Josh Pringle  2 349 (7.31%)
|
|Jeff Arbus  8 475 (26.38%)
|
|Andre Reopel  1 377 (4.29%)
|
|Bil Murphy  605 (1.88%)
|
|
||
|David Orazietti
|-
|bgcolor=whitesmoke|Sudbury
||
|Rick Bartolucci  19 307 (58.77%)
|
|Louis Delongchamp  2 605 (7.93%)
|
|Dave Battaino  8 914 (27.13%)
|
|David Sylvester  1 608 (4.89%)
|
|Carita Murphy-Marketos  293 (0.89%)
|
|J. David Popescu (Ind)  124 (0.38%)
||
|Rick Bartolucci
|-
|bgcolor=whitesmoke|Thunder Bay—Atikokan
||
|Bill Mauro  10 928 (37.69%)
|
|Rebecca Johnson  5 918 (20.41%)
|
|John Rafferty  10 878 (37.52%)
|
|Russ Aegard(Wikinews interview)  1 270 (4.38%)
|
| 
|
|
||
|Bill Mauro
|-
|bgcolor=whitesmoke|Thunder Bay—Superior North
||
|Michael Gravelle  13 373 (46.78%)
|
|Scott Hobbs  2 688 (9.40%)
|
|Jim Foulds  10 938 (38.26%)
|
|Dawn Kannegiesser  1 586 (5.55%)
|
| 
|
|
||
|Michael Gravelle
|-
|bgcolor=whitesmoke|Timiskaming—Cochrane
||
|David Ramsay  11 588 (42.90%)
|
|Doug Shearer  3 659 (13.55%)
|
|John Vanthof  10 954 (40.55%)
|
|Patrick East  811 (3.00%)
|
| 
|
|
||
|David Ramsay
|-
|bgcolor=whitesmoke|Timmins—James Bay
|
|Pat Boucher  9 729 (38.10%)
|
|Steve Kidd  2 191 (8.58%)
||
|Gilles Bisson  13 176 (51.60%)
|
|Larry Verner  437 (1.71%)
|
| 
|
|
||
|Gilles Bisson
|}

External links 
 Registered Candidate's Contact Information at Elections Ontario
 Elections results (courtesy of CTV)
 Election results (courtesy of Elections Ontario)

2007 Ontario general election